Snakefish is a colloquial term used for a number of species of fish that resemble snakes. Trachinocephalus myops, native to parts of both the Atlantic and Pacific oceans, is known by this name in particular.

See also
Snakehead fish
Hadag Nahash, an Israeli band whose name translates to 'snakefish'

Fish common names